The 1957 Colgate Red Raiders football team was an American football team that represented Colgate University as an independent during the 1957 NCAA University Division football season. Following the offseason departure of head coach Hal Lahar, the school promoted Fred Rice, its former backfield coach, who led the team to a 3–6 record. Ralph Antone was the team captain. 

The team played its home games at Colgate Athletic Field in Hamilton, New York.

Schedule

Leading players 
Statistical leaders for the 1957 Red Raiders included: 
 Rushing: Ted Boccuzzi, 369 yards and 2 touchdowns on 100 attempts
 Passing: Raymond Harding, 762 yards, 64 completions and 7 touchdowns on 152 attempts
 Receiving: Alfred Jamison, 420 yards and 6 touchdowns on 33 receptions
 Total offense: Raymond Harding, 702 yards (762 passing, minus-60 rushing)
 Scoring: Al Jamison, 36 points from 6 touchdowns
 All-purpose yards: Ted Boccuzzi, 657 yards (369 rushing, 112 kickoff returning, 107 receiving, 69 punt returning)

References

Colgate
Colgate Raiders football seasons
Colgate Red Raiders football